Now Kola (also Romanized as Now Kolā; also known as Now Kolā va Bībī Kolā) is a village in Balatajan Rural District, in the Central District of Qaem Shahr County, Mazandaran Province, Iran. At the 2006 census, its population was 427, in 102 families.

References 

Populated places in Qaem Shahr County